Dato' Haji Abdul Rahim bin Mohd Razali  (born 3 July 1939), better known by his stage name Rahim Razali, is a Malaysian actor, director, producer and sports commentator.

Life and career 
English school at Anderson Ipoh High School, Anderson School, Ipoh. Then continue studying at University of Melbourne for five years under the Chartered Accountancy under the Colombo Plan.

He worked as a broadcasting assistant at Radio Malaya, Tobacco Co. Bhd, at the Ministry of Culture, and SSC & B Lintas Sdn. Bhd and SHBenson Advertising Company's cigarette company. Then work in Fleet Communication. 1981 established the company's own Aboriginal Artist Generation XX Sdn Bhd with Wan Rohani Zain, former RTM newsmaster.

Since the 1950s he has been a scriptwriter and director for drama at his school. In Australia, Rahim joined the Melbourne University Theater Dub, the Brighton Theater Group, and the Australian Broadcasting Commission. 1963, acted as a Hamlet in Hamlet, a showcase for Brighton Thearte Group. In 2010 she instructed Usman Awang's original Uda & Dara Musical. He was responsible for lining up and highlighting star-studded talents since the 70s, and his latest featured popular singer Misha Omar as a musical theater star with a balance in acting and singing.

He published 50 television dramas in RTM and ran 15 films. Since the 1960s, he joined the acting world at RTM. Since 1981 he has been nominated for 8 films and films representing the country to the Tokyo International Film Festival, the London International Film Festival and others.

Dato 'Rahim was best known for his collaboration with Syamsul Yusof in the movie Munafik which he made as the father of Ustaz Adam. He returned to his character in his continuation which aired on 30 August 2018.

Filmography

Film

Television series

Telemovie

TV commercial

Theater

Television

Honours
  :
  Knight Commander of the Order of the Perak State Crown (DPMP) – Dato' (1995)

References

External links
 

Living people
Malaysian male actors
Malaysian television personalities
Malaysian people of Malay descent
Malaysian Muslims
Malaysian people of Banjar descent
1939 births